Arnaud Bertheux (born January 27, 1977) is a  footballer currently playing for Vendée Luçon Football in the Championnat de France amateur.

External links
Arnaud Bertheux profile at chamoisfc79.fr

1977 births
Living people
French footballers
Association football defenders
Chamois Niortais F.C. players
Ligue 2 players
US Orléans players
Luçon FC players
Wasquehal Football players